Doctor Ruhland (German: Doktor Ruhland) is a 1920 Austrian silent film directed by Max Neufeld and starring Neufeld and Liane Haid.

Cast
 Max Neufeld
 Liane Haid
 Hans Rhoden
 Marietta Weber

References

Bibliography
 Parish, Robert. Film Actors Guide. Scarecrow Press, 1977.

External links

1920 films
Austrian silent feature films
Films directed by Max Neufeld
Austrian black-and-white films